Doctor Who is a British science fiction television series broadcast by the BBC since 1963. The series depicts the adventures of a Time Lord called the Doctor, an extraterrestrial being who appears to be human. The Doctor explores the universe in a time-travelling space ship called the TARDIS. The TARDIS exterior appears as a blue British police box, which was a common sight in Britain in 1963 when the series first aired. With various companions, the Doctor combats foes, works to save civilisations, and helps people in need.

Beginning with William Hartnell, thirteen actors have headlined the series as the Doctor; in 2017, Jodie Whittaker became the first woman to officially play the role on television. The transition from one actor to another is written into the plot of the series with the concept of regeneration into a new incarnation, a plot device in which a Time Lord "transforms" into a new body when the current one is too badly harmed to heal normally. Each actor's portrayal is unique, but all represent stages in the life of the same character, and together, they form a single lifetime with a single narrative. The time-travelling feature of the plot means that different incarnations of the Doctor occasionally meet.

The series is a significant part of popular culture in Britain and elsewhere; it has gained a cult following. It has influenced generations of British television professionals, many of whom grew up watching the series. Fans of the series are sometimes referred to as Whovians. The series is listed in Guinness World Records as the longest-running science-fiction television series in the world, as well as the "most successful" science-fiction series of all time, based on its overall broadcast ratings, DVD and book sales, and iTunes traffic.

The series originally ran from 1963 to 1989. There was an unsuccessful attempt to revive regular production in 1996 with a backdoor pilot in the form of a television film titled Doctor Who. The series was relaunched in 2005 and since then, has been produced in-house by BBC Wales in Cardiff. Doctor Who has also spawned numerous spin-offs, including comic books, films, novels, audio dramas, and the television series Torchwood (2006–2011), The Sarah Jane Adventures (2007–2011), K9 (2009–2010), and Class (2016). It has been the subject of many parodies and references in popular culture.

Premise
Doctor Who follows the adventures of the title character, a rogue Time Lord with somewhat unknown origins who goes by the name "the Doctor". The Doctor fled Gallifrey, the planet of the Time Lords, in a stolen TARDIS ("Time and Relative Dimension in Space"), a time machine that travels by materialising into, and dematerialising out of, the time vortex. The TARDIS has a vast interior but appears smaller on the outside, and is equipped with a "chameleon circuit" intended to make the machine take on the appearance of local objects as a disguise. Due to a malfunction, the Doctor's TARDIS remains fixed as a blue British police box.

Across time and space, the Doctor's many incarnations often find events that pique their curiosity, and try to prevent evil forces from harming innocent people or changing history, using only ingenuity and minimal resources, such as the versatile sonic screwdriver. The Doctor rarely travels alone and is often joined by one or more companions on these adventures; these companions are usually humans, owing to the Doctor's fascination with planet Earth, which also leads to frequent collaborations with the international military task force UNIT when Earth is threatened. The Doctor is centuries old and as a Time Lord, has the ability to regenerate when there is mortal damage to their body. The Doctor's various incarnations have gained numerous recurring enemies during their travels, including the Daleks, their creator Davros, the Cybermen, and the renegade Time Lord the Master.

History

Doctor Who first appeared on the BBC Television Service at 17:16:20 GMT on Saturday, 23 November 1963; this was eighty seconds later than the scheduled programme time, because of announcements concerning the previous day's assassination of John F. Kennedy. It was to be a regular weekly programme, each episode 25 minutes of transmission length. Discussions and plans for the programme had been in progress for a year. The head of drama Sydney Newman was mainly responsible for developing the programme, with the first format document for the series being written by Newman along with the head of the script department (later head of serials) Donald Wilson and staff writer C. E. Webber; in a 1971 interview Wilson claimed to have named the series, and when this claim was put to Newman he did not dispute it. Writer Anthony Coburn, story editor David Whitaker and initial producer Verity Lambert also heavily contributed to the development of the series.

The programme was originally intended to appeal to a family audience as an educational programme using time travel as a means to explore scientific ideas and famous moments in history. On 31 July 1963, Whitaker commissioned Terry Nation to write a story under the title The Mutants. As originally written, the Daleks and Thals were the victims of an alien neutron bomb attack but Nation later dropped the aliens and made the Daleks the aggressors. When the script was presented to Newman and Wilson it was immediately rejected as the programme was not permitted to contain any "bug-eyed monsters". According to Lambert, "We didn't have a lot of choice—we only had the Dalek serial to go ... We had a bit of a crisis of confidence because Donald [Wilson] was so adamant that we shouldn't make it. Had we had anything else ready we would have made that." Nation's script became the second Doctor Who serial – The Daleks (also known as The Mutants). The serial introduced the eponymous aliens that would become the series' most popular monsters, and was responsible for the BBC's first merchandising boom.

The BBC drama department's serials division produced the programme for 26 seasons, broadcast on BBC One. Due to his increasingly poor health, the first actor to play the Doctor, William Hartnell, was replaced by the younger Patrick Troughton in 1966. In 1970, Jon Pertwee replaced Troughton and the series at that point moved from black and white to colour. In 1974, Tom Baker was cast as the Doctor. His eccentric style of dress and quirky personality became hugely popular, with viewing figures for the series returning to a level not seen since the height of "Dalekmania" a decade earlier. In 1981, after a record seven years in the role, Baker was replaced by Peter Davison, at 29 by far the youngest actor to be cast as the character in the series' first run and, in 1984, Colin Baker replaced Davison. In 1985, the channel's controller Michael Grade attempted to cancel the series, but this became an 18-month hiatus instead. He also had Colin Baker removed from the starring role in 1986. The role was recast with Sylvester McCoy, but falling viewing numbers, a decline in the public perception of the series and a less-prominent transmission slot saw production ended in 1989 by Peter Cregeen, the BBC's new head of series. Although it was effectively cancelled with the decision not to commission a planned 27th season, which would have been broadcast in 1990, the BBC repeatedly affirmed, over several years, that the series would return.

While in-house production had ceased, the BBC hoped to find an independent production company to relaunch the series. Philip Segal, a British expatriate who worked for Columbia Pictures' television arm in the United States, had approached the BBC about such a venture as early as July 1989, while the 26th season was still in production. Segal's negotiations eventually led to a Doctor Who television film, broadcast on the Fox Network in 1996, as an international co-production between Fox, Universal Pictures, the BBC and BBC Worldwide. Starring Paul McGann as the Doctor, the film was successful in the UK (with 9.1 million viewers), but was less so in the United States and did not lead to a series.

Licensed media such as novels and audio plays provided new stories, but as a television programme, Doctor Who remained dormant until 2003. In September of that year, BBC Television announced the in-house production of a new series, after several years of attempts by BBC Worldwide to find backing for a feature film version. The executive producers of the new incarnation of the series were writer Russell T Davies and BBC Cymru Wales head of drama Julie Gardner. From 2005, the series switched from a multi-camera to a single-camera setup.

Starring Christopher Eccleston as the Doctor, Doctor Who finally returned with the episode "Rose" on BBC One on 26 March 2005. Eccleston left after one series and was replaced by David Tennant. There have since been eleven further series in 2006–2008, 2010–2015, 2017–2018, and 2020, as well as Christmas/New Year's Day specials every year since 2005. No full series was broadcast in 2009, although four additional specials starring Tennant were made. Davies left the series in 2010 after the end of series 4, and the David Tennant specials were completed. Steven Moffat, a writer under Davies, was announced as his successor, along with Matt Smith as the new Doctor. Smith decided to leave the role of the Doctor in the 50th-anniversary year. He was replaced by Peter Capaldi.

In January 2016, Moffat announced that he would step down after the 2017 finale, to be replaced by Chris Chibnall in 2018. The tenth series debuted in April 2017, with a Christmas special preceding it in 2016. Jodie Whittaker, the first female Doctor, appeared in three series, the last of which was shortened due to the COVID-19 pandemic.

Both Whittaker and Chibnall announced that they would depart the series after a series of 2022 specials following the 13th series. Davies returned as showrunner from the 60th-anniversary specials, twelve years after he had left the series previously. Bad Wolf co-produces the series in partnership with BBC Studios. Bad Wolf's involvement sees Gardner return to the series alongside Davies and Jane Tranter, who recommissioned the series in 2005.

The 2005 version of Doctor Who is a direct plot continuation of the original 1963–1989 series and the 1996 telefilm. This is similar to the 1988 continuation of Mission Impossible, but differs from most other series' relaunches of the time which have either been reboots (for example, Battlestar Galactica and Bionic Woman) or set in the same universe as the original, but in a different time period and with different characters (for example, Star Trek: The Next Generation and spin-offs).

The programme has been sold to many other countries worldwide .

Public consciousness

It has been claimed that the transmission of the first episode was delayed by ten minutes due to extended news coverage of the assassination of US President John F. Kennedy the previous day; in fact, it went out after a delay of eighty seconds. The BBC believed that coverage of the assassination, as well as a series of power blackouts across the country, had caused many viewers to miss this introduction to a new series, and it was broadcast again on 30 November 1963, just before episode two.

The programme soon became a national institution in the United Kingdom, with a large following among the general viewing audience. With popularity came controversy over the series's suitability for children. Morality campaigner Mary Whitehouse repeatedly complained to the BBC over what she saw as the series's violent, frightening and gory content. According to Radio Times, the series "never had a more implacable foe than Mary Whitehouse".

A BBC audience research survey conducted in 1972 found that, by their own definition of violence ("any act[s] which may cause physical and/or psychological injury, hurt or death to persons, animals or property, whether intentional or accidental") Doctor Who was the most violent of the drama programmes the corporation produced at the time. The same report found that 3% of the surveyed audience regarded the series as "very unsuitable" for family viewing. Responding to the findings of the survey in The Times newspaper, journalist Philip Howard maintained that, "to compare the violence of Dr Who, sired by a horse-laugh out of a nightmare, with the more realistic violence of other television series, where actors who look like human beings bleed paint that looks like blood, is like comparing Monopoly with the property market in London: both are fantasies, but one is meant to be taken seriously."

During Jon Pertwee's second season as the Doctor, in the serial Terror of the Autons (1971), images of murderous plastic dolls, daffodils killing unsuspecting victims, and blank-featured policemen marked the apex of the series's ability to frighten children. Other notable moments in that decade include a disembodied brain falling to the floor in The Brain of Morbius and the Doctor apparently being drowned by a villain in The Deadly Assassin (both 1976). Mary Whitehouse's complaint about the latter incident prompted a change in BBC policy towards the series, with much tighter controls imposed on the production team, and the series' next producer, Graham Williams, was under a directive to take out "anything graphic in the depiction of violence". John Nathan-Turner produced the series during the 1980s and said in the documentary More Than Thirty Years in the TARDIS that he looked forward to Whitehouse's comments because the series's ratings would increase soon after she had made them. Nevertheless, Nathan-Turner also got into trouble with BBC executives over the violence he allowed to be depicted for season 22 of the series in 1985, which was publicly criticised by controller Michael Grade and given as one of his reasons for suspending the series for 18 months.

The phrase "Hiding behind (or 'watching from behind') the sofa" entered British pop culture, signifying the stereotypical early-series behaviour of children who wanted to avoid seeing frightening parts of a television programme while remaining in the room to watch the remainder of it. The phrase retains this association with Doctor Who, to the point that in 1991 the Museum of the Moving Image in London named their exhibition celebrating the programme "Behind the Sofa". The electronic theme music too was perceived as eerie, novel, and frightening at the time. A 2012 article placed this childhood juxtaposition of fear and thrill "at the center of many people's relationship with the series", and a 2011 online vote at Digital Spy deemed the series the "scariest TV show of all time".

The image of the TARDIS has become firmly linked to the series in the public's consciousness; BBC scriptwriter Anthony Coburn, who lived in the resort of Herne Bay, Kent, was one of the people who conceived the idea of a police box as a time machine. In 1996, the BBC applied for a trademark to use the TARDIS' blue police box design in merchandising associated with Doctor Who. In 1998, the Metropolitan Police Authority filed an objection to the trademark claim; but in 2002, the Patent Office ruled in favour of the BBC.

The 21st-century revival of the programme became the centrepiece of BBC One's Saturday schedule and "defined the channel". Many renowned actors asked for or were offered guest-starring roles in various stories. According to an article in the Daily Telegraph in 2009, the revival of Doctor Who had consistently received high ratings, both in number of viewers and as measured by the Appreciation Index. In 2007, Caitlin Moran, television reviewer for The Times, wrote that Doctor Who is "quintessential to being British". According to Steven Moffat, the American film director Steven Spielberg has commented that "the world would be a poorer place without Doctor Who".

On 4 August 2013, a live programme titled Doctor Who Live: The Next Doctor was broadcast on BBC One, during which the actor who was going to play the Twelfth Doctor was revealed. The live show was watched by an average of 6.27 million in the UK, and was also simulcast in the United States, Canada and Australia.

Episodes

Doctor Who originally ran for 26 seasons on BBC One, from 23 November 1963 until 6 December 1989. During the original run, each weekly episode formed part of a story (or "serial")—usually of four to six parts in earlier years and three to four in later years. Some notable exceptions were: The Daleks' Master Plan, which aired twelve episodes (plus an earlier one-episode teaser, "Mission to the Unknown", featuring none of the regular cast); almost an entire season of seven-episode serials (season 7); the ten-episode serial The War Games; and The Trial of a Time Lord, which ran for fourteen episodes (albeit divided into three production codes and four narrative segments) during season 23. Occasionally, serials were loosely connected by a story line, such as season 8 focusing on the Doctor battling a rogue Time Lord called the Master, season 16's quest for the Key to Time, season 18's journey through E-Space and the theme of entropy, and season 20's Black Guardian trilogy.

The programme was intended to be educational and for family viewing on the early Saturday evening schedule. It initially alternated stories set in the past, which taught younger audience members about history, and with those in the future or outer space, focusing on science. This was also reflected in the Doctor's original companions, one of whom was a science teacher and another a history teacher.

However, science fiction stories came to dominate the programme, and the history-oriented episodes, which were not popular with the production team, were dropped after The Highlanders (1967). While the show continued to use historical settings, they were generally used as a backdrop for science fiction tales, with one exception: Black Orchid (1982), set in 1920s England.

The early stories were serialised in nature, with the narrative of one story flowing into the next and each episode having its own title, although produced as distinct stories with their own production codes. Following The Gunfighters (1966), however, each serial was given its own title, and the individual parts were assigned episode numbers.

Of the programme's many writers, Robert Holmes was the most prolific, while Douglas Adams became the best known outside Doctor Who itself, due to the popularity of his Hitchhiker's Guide to the Galaxy works.

The serial format changed for the 2005 revival, with what was now called a series usually consisting of thirteen 45-minute, self-contained episodes (60 minutes with adverts, on overseas commercial channels) and an extended 60-minute episode broadcast on Christmas Day. This system was shortened to twelve episodes and one Christmas special following the revival's eighth series, and ten episodes from the  eleventh series. Each series includes standalone and multiple episodic stories, often linked with a loose story arc resolved in the series finale. As in the early "classic" era, each episode has its own title, whether stand-alone or part of a larger story. Occasionally, regular-series episodes will exceed the 45-minute run time; notably, the episodes "Journey's End" from 2008 and "The Eleventh Hour" from 2010 exceeded an hour in length.

 Doctor Who instalments have been televised since 1963, ranging between 25-minute episodes (the most common format for the classic era), 45/50-minute episodes (for Resurrection of the Daleks in the 1984 series, a single season in 1985, and the most common format for the revival era since 2005), two feature-length productions (1983's The Five Doctors and the 1996 television film), twelve Christmas specials (most of approximately 60 minutes' duration, one of 72 minutes), and four additional specials ranging from 60 to 75 minutes in 2009, 2010, and 2013. Four mini-episodes, running about eight minutes each, were also produced for the 1993, 2005, and 2007 Children in Need charity appeals, while another mini-episode was produced in 2008 for a Doctor Who–themed edition of The Proms. The 1993 two-part story, entitled Dimensions in Time, was made in collaboration with the cast of the BBC soap-opera EastEnders and was filmed partly on the EastEnders set. A two-part mini-episode was also produced for the 2011 edition of Comic Relief. Starting with the 2009 special "Planet of the Dead", the series was filmed in 1080i for HDTV and broadcast simultaneously on BBC One and BBC HD.

To celebrate the 50th anniversary of the show, a special 3D episode, "The Day of the Doctor", was broadcast in 2013. In March 2013, it was announced that Tennant and Piper would be returning and that the episode would have a limited cinematic release worldwide.

In June 2017, it was announced that due to the terms of a deal between BBC Worldwide and SMG Pictures in China, the company has first right of refusal on the purchase for the Chinese market of future series of the programme until and including Series 15.

Missing episodes

Between 1967 and 1978, large amounts of older material stored in the BBC's various video tape and film libraries was either destroyed or wiped. This included many early episodes of Doctor Who, those stories featuring the first two Doctors: William Hartnell and Patrick Troughton. In all, 97 of 253 episodes produced during the programme's first six years are not held in the BBC's archives (most notably seasons 3, 4, and 5, from which 79 episodes are missing). In 1972, almost all episodes then made were known to exist at the BBC, while by 1978 the practice of wiping tapes and destroying "spare" film copies had been brought to a stop.

No 1960s episodes exist on their original videotapes (all surviving prints being film transfers), though some were transferred to film for editing before transmission and exist in their broadcast form.

Some episodes have been returned to the BBC from the archives of other countries that bought prints for broadcast or by private individuals who acquired them by various means. Early colour videotape recordings made off-air by fans have also been retrieved, as well as excerpts filmed from the television screen onto 8 mm cine film and clips that were shown on other programmes. Audio versions of all lost episodes exist from home viewers who made tape recordings of the show. Short clips from every story with the exception of Marco Polo (1964), "Mission to the Unknown" (1965) and The Massacre (1966) also exist.

In addition to these, there are off-screen photographs made by photographer John Cura, who was hired by various production personnel to document many of their programmes during the 1950s and 1960s, including Doctor Who. These have been used in fan reconstructions of the serials. The BBC has tolerated these amateur reconstructions, provided they are not sold for profit and are distributed as low-quality copies.

One of the most sought-after lost episodes is part four of the last William Hartnell serial, The Tenth Planet (1966), which ends with the First Doctor transforming into the Second. The only portion of this in existence, barring a few poor-quality silent 8 mm clips, is the few seconds of the regeneration scene, as it was shown on the children's magazine show Blue Peter. With the approval of the BBC, efforts are now underway to restore as many of the episodes as possible from the extant material.

"Official" reconstructions have also been released by the BBC on VHS, on MP3 CD-ROM, and as special features on DVD. The BBC, in conjunction with animation studio Cosgrove Hall, reconstructed the missing episodes 1 and 4 of The Invasion (1968), using remastered audio tracks and the comprehensive stage notes for the original filming, for the serial's DVD release in November 2006. The missing episodes of The Reign of Terror were animated by animation company Theta-Sigma, in collaboration with Big Finish, and became available for purchase in May 2013 through Amazon.com. Subsequent animations made in 2013 include The Tenth Planet, The Ice Warriors (1967) and The Moonbase (1967).

In April 2006, Blue Peter launched a challenge to find missing Doctor Who episodes with the promise of a full-scale Dalek model as a reward. In December 2011, it was announced that part 3 of Galaxy 4 (1965) and part 2 of The Underwater Menace (1967) had been returned to the BBC by a fan who had purchased them in the mid-1980s without realising that the BBC did not hold copies of them.

On 10 October 2013, the BBC announced that films of eleven episodes, including nine missing episodes, had been found in a Nigerian television relay station in Jos. Six of the eleven films discovered were the six-part serial The Enemy of the World (1968), from which all but the third episode had been missing. The remaining films were from another six-part serial, The Web of Fear (1968), and included the previously missing episodes 2, 4, 5 and 6. Episode 3 of The Web of Fear is still missing.

Characters

The Doctor

The Doctor was initially shrouded in mystery. In the programme's early days, the character was an eccentric alien traveller of great intelligence who battled injustice while exploring time and space in an unreliable time machine, the "TARDIS" (an acronym for Time and Relative Dimension in Space), which notably appears much larger on the inside than on the outside (a quality referred to as "dimensionally transcendental").

The initially irascible and slightly sinister Doctor quickly mellowed into a more compassionate figure and was eventually revealed to be a Time Lord, whose race are from the planet Gallifrey, which the Doctor fled by stealing the TARDIS.

Changes of appearance

Producers introduced the concept of regeneration to permit the recasting of the main character. This was prompted by the poor health of the original star, William Hartnell. The term "regeneration" was not conceived until the Doctor's third on-screen regeneration; Hartnell's Doctor merely described undergoing a "renewal", and the Second Doctor underwent a "change of appearance". The device has allowed for the recasting of the actor various times in the show's history, as well as the depiction of alternative Doctors either from the Doctor's relative past or future.

The serials The Deadly Assassin (1976) and Mawdryn Undead (1983) established that a Time Lord can only regenerate 12 times, for a total of 13 incarnations. This line became stuck in the public consciousness despite not often being repeated and was recognised by producers of the show as a plot obstacle for when the show finally had to regenerate the Doctor a thirteenth time. The episode "The Time of the Doctor" (2013) depicted the Doctor acquiring a new cycle of regenerations, starting from the Twelfth Doctor, due to the Eleventh Doctor being the product of the Doctor's twelfth regeneration from his original set.

Although the idea of casting a woman as the Doctor had been suggested by the show's writers several times, including by Newman in 1986 and Davies in 2008, until 2017, all official depictions were played by men. Jodie Whittaker took over the role as the Thirteenth Doctor at the end of the 2017 Christmas special and is the first woman to be cast as the character. The show introduced the Time Lords' ability to change sex on regeneration in earlier episodes, first in dialogue, then with Michelle Gomez's version of The Master and T'Nia Miller's version of The General.

On 8 May 2022, it was announced that, upon the regeneration of Jodie Whittaker's Thirteenth Doctor, Ncuti Gatwa as Fourteenth Doctor would become the first black actor to headline the series. Upon Whittaker's final appearance in "The Power of the Doctor" as the character on 23 October 2022, she instead regenerated into a form portrayed by David Tennant, who was confirmed to be the Fourteenth Doctor—the first actor to play as two incarnations—with later clarification that Gatwa would actually portray the Fifteenth Doctor. 

In addition to those actors who have headlined the series, others have portrayed versions of the Doctor in guest roles. Notably, in 2013, John Hurt guest-starred as a hitherto unknown incarnation of the Doctor known as the War Doctor in the run-up to the show's 50th-anniversary special "The Day of the Doctor". He is shown in mini-episode "The Night of the Doctor" retroactively inserted into the show's fictional chronology between McGann's and Eccleston's Doctors, although his introduction was written so as not to disturb the established numerical naming of the Doctors. The show later introduced another such unknown past Doctor with Jo Martin's recurring portrayal of the Fugitive Doctor, beginning with "Fugitive of the Judoon" (2020). An example from the classic series comes from The Trial of a Time Lord (1986), in which Michael Jayston's character the Valeyard is described as an amalgamation of the darker sides of the Doctor's nature, somewhere between the twelfth and final incarnation.

On rare occasions, other actors have stood in for the lead. In The Five Doctors, Richard Hurndall played the First Doctor due to William Hartnell's death in 1975; 34 years later David Bradley similarly replaced Hartnell in Twice Upon a Time. In Time and the Rani, Sylvester McCoy briefly played the Sixth Doctor during the regeneration sequence, carrying on as the Seventh. In other media, the Doctor has been played by various other actors, including Peter Cushing in two films. For more information, see the list of actors who have played the Doctor.

The casting of a new Doctor has often inspired debate and speculation. Common topics of focus include the Doctor's sex (prior to the casting of Whittaker, all official incarnations were male), race (all Doctors were white prior to the casting of Jo Martin in "Fugitive of the Judoon") and age (the youngest actor to be cast is Smith at 26, and the oldest are Capaldi and Hartnell, both 55).

Meetings of different incarnations
There have been instances of actors returning later to reprise their specific Doctor's role. In 1973's The Three Doctors, William Hartnell and Patrick Troughton returned alongside Jon Pertwee. For 1983's The Five Doctors, Troughton and Pertwee returned to star with Peter Davison, and Tom Baker appeared in previously unseen footage from the uncompleted Shada serial. For this episode, Richard Hurndall replaced William Hartnell. Patrick Troughton again returned in 1985's The Two Doctors with Colin Baker. In 2007, Peter Davison returned in the Children in Need short "Time Crash" alongside David Tennant. In "The Name of the Doctor" (2013), the Eleventh Doctor meets a previously unseen incarnation of himself, subsequently revealed to be the War Doctor. In the following episode, "The Day of the Doctor", David Tennant's Tenth Doctor appeared alongside Matt Smith as the Eleventh Doctor and John Hurt as the War Doctor, as well as brief footage of all the previous actors. In 2017, the First Doctor (this time portrayed by David Bradley) returned alongside Peter Capaldi in "The Doctor Falls" and "Twice Upon a Time". In 2020's "Fugitive of the Judoon", Jodie Whittaker as the Thirteenth Doctor meets Jo Martin's incarnation of the Doctor, subsequently known as the Fugitive Doctor; they later interact in "The Timeless Children" later that year and "Once Upon Time" in 2021. In her final episode, "The Power of the Doctor" (2022), Whittaker interacts with the Guardians of the Edge, manifestations of the Doctor's First (Bradley), Fifth (Davison), Sixth (Colin Baker), Seventh (McCoy), and Eighth (McGann) incarnations. Additionally, multiple incarnations of the Doctor have met in various audio dramas and novels based on the television show.

Revelations about the Doctor

Throughout the programme's long history, there have been revelations about the Doctor that have raised additional questions. In The Brain of Morbius (1976), it was hinted that the First Doctor might not have been the first incarnation (although the other faces depicted might have been incarnations of the Time Lord Morbius). In subsequent stories, the First Doctor was depicted as the earliest incarnation of the Doctor. In Mawdryn Undead (1983), the Fifth Doctor explicitly confirmed that he was then currently in his fifth incarnation. Later that same year, during 1983's 20th-anniversary special The Five Doctors, the First Doctor enquires as to the Fifth Doctor's regeneration; when the Fifth Doctor confirms "Fourth", the First Doctor excitedly replies, "Goodness me. So there are five of me now." In 2010, the Eleventh Doctor similarly calls himself "the Eleventh" in "The Lodger". In the 2013 episode "The Time of the Doctor", the Eleventh Doctor clarifies that he is the product of the twelfth regeneration due to a previous incarnation that he chooses not to count and one other aborted regeneration. The name Eleventh is still used for this incarnation; the same episode depicts the prophesied "Fall of the Eleventh", which had been trailed throughout the series. While the Doctor was early on described as from the planet Gallifrey, as first mentioned in The Time Warrior (1973), these origins were retconned in The Timeless Children (2020), and the Doctor was shown as from another unknown dimension or universe. In the same story, it was revealed that First Doctor was not the earliest incarnation of the Doctor.

During the Seventh Doctor's era, it was hinted that the Doctor was more than just an ordinary Time Lord. In the 1996 television film, the Eighth Doctor describes himself as being "half human". The BBC's FAQ for the programme notes that "purists tend to disregard this", instead focusing on his Gallifreyan heritage.

The programme's first serial, An Unearthly Child, shows that the Doctor has a granddaughter, Susan Foreman. In the 1967 serial, The Tomb of the Cybermen, when Victoria Waterfield doubts the Doctor can remember his family because of "being so ancient", the Doctor says that he can when he really wants to—"The rest of the time they sleep in my mind". The 2005 series reveals that the Ninth Doctor thought he was the last surviving Time Lord and that his home planet had been destroyed; in "The Empty Child" (2005), Dr. Constantine states, "Before the war even began, I was a father and a grandfather. Now I am neither." The Doctor remarks in response, "Yeah, I know the feeling." In "Smith and Jones" (2007), when asked if he had a brother, he replied, "No, not any more." In both "Fear Her" (2006) and "The Doctor's Daughter" (2008), he states that he had, in the past, been a father.

In "The Wedding of River Song" (2011), it is implied that the Doctor's true name is a secret that must never be revealed; this is explored further in "The Name of the Doctor" (2013), when River Song speaking his name allows the Great Intelligence to enter his tomb, and in "The Time of the Doctor" (2013) where speaking his true name becomes the signal by which the Time Lords would know they can safely return to the universe.

Companions

The companion figure – generally a human – has been a constant feature in Doctor Who since the programme's inception in 1963. One of the roles of the companion is to be a reminder for the Doctor's "moral duty". The Doctor's first companions seen on-screen were his granddaughter Susan Foreman (Carole Ann Ford) and her teachers Barbara Wright (Jacqueline Hill) and Ian Chesterton (William Russell). These characters were intended to act as audience surrogates, through which the audience would discover information about the Doctor, who was to act as a mysterious father figure. The only story from the original series in which the Doctor travels alone is "The Deadly Assassin" (1976). Notable companions from the earlier series include Romana (Mary Tamm and Lalla Ward), a Time Lady; Sarah Jane Smith (Elisabeth Sladen); and Jo Grant (Katy Manning). Dramatically, these characters provide a figure with whom the audience can identify and serve to further the story by requesting exposition from the Doctor and manufacturing peril for the Doctor to resolve. The Doctor regularly gains new companions and loses old ones; sometimes they return home or find new causes—or loves—on worlds they have visited. Some have died during the course of the series. Companions are usually humans or humanoid aliens.

Since the 2005 revival, the Doctor generally travels with a primary female companion, who occupies a larger narrative role. Steven Moffat described the companion as the main character of the show, as the story begins anew with each companion and she undergoes more change than the Doctor. The primary companions of the Ninth and Tenth Doctors were Rose Tyler (Billie Piper), Martha Jones (Freema Agyeman), and Donna Noble (Catherine Tate), with Mickey Smith (Noel Clarke) and Jack Harkness (John Barrowman) recurring as secondary companion figures. The Eleventh Doctor became the first to travel with a married couple, Amy Pond (Karen Gillan) and Rory Williams (Arthur Darvill), whilst out-of-sync meetings with River Song (Alex Kingston) and Clara Oswald (Jenna Coleman) provided ongoing story arcs that continued with the Twelfth Doctor. The tenth series included the alien Nardole (Matt Lucas) and introduced Pearl Mackie as Bill Potts, the Doctor's first openly gay companion. Pearl Mackie said that the increased representation of LGBTQ people is important on a mainstream show. The Thirteenth Doctor has primarily travelled with Ryan Sinclair (Tosin Cole), Graham O'Brien (Bradley Walsh), Yasmin Khan (Mandip Gill), and Dan Lewis (John Bishop).

Some companions have gone on to reappear, either in the main series or in spin-offs. Sarah Jane Smith became the central character in The Sarah Jane Adventures (2007–2011) following a return to Doctor Who in 2006. Guest stars in the series include former companions Jo Grant, K9, and Brigadier Lethbridge-Stewart (Nicholas Courtney). The character of Jack Harkness also served to launch a spin-off, Torchwood (2006–2011), in which Martha Jones also appeared.

Adversaries

When Sydney Newman commissioned the series, he specifically did not want to perpetuate the cliché of the "bug-eyed monster" of science fiction. However, monsters were popular with audiences and so became a staple of Doctor Who almost from the beginning.

With the show's 2005 revival, executive producer Russell T Davies stated his intention to reintroduce the classic icons of Doctor Who. The Autons with the Nestene Consciousness and Daleks returned in series 1, Cybermen in series 2, the Macra and the Master in series 3, the Sontarans and Davros in series 4, and the Time Lords, including Rassilon, in the 2009–2010 specials. Davies's successor, Steven Moffat, has continued the trend by reviving the Silurians in series 5, Cybermats in series 6, the Great Intelligence and the Ice Warriors in Series 7, and Zygons in the 50th-anniversary special. Since its 2005 return, the series has also introduced new recurring aliens: Slitheen (Raxacoricofallapatorians), Ood, Judoon, Weeping Angels and the Silence.

Besides infrequent appearances by enemies such as the Ice Warriors, Ogrons, the Rani, and Black Guardian, three adversaries have become particularly iconic: the Daleks, the Cybermen, and the Master.

Daleks

The Dalek race, which first appeared in the show's second serial in 1963, are Doctor Whos oldest villains. The Daleks are Kaleds from the planet Skaro, mutated by the scientist Davros and housed in mechanical armour shells for mobility. The actual creatures resemble octopuses with large, pronounced brains. Their armour shells have a single eye-stalk, a sink-plunger-like device that serves the purpose of a hand, and a directed-energy weapon. Their main weakness is their eyestalk;  attacks upon them using various weapons can blind a Dalek, making it go mad. Their chief role in the series plot, as they frequently remark in their instantly recognisable metallic voices, is to "exterminate" all non-Dalek beings. They even attack the Time Lords in the Time War, as shown during the 50th Anniversary of the show. They continue to be a recurring 'monster' within the Doctor Who franchise, their most recent appearance being the 2022 episode "The Power of the Doctor". Davros has also been a recurring figure since his debut in Genesis of the Daleks, although played by several different actors.

The Daleks were created by the writer Terry Nation (who intended them to be an allegory of the Nazis) and BBC designer Raymond Cusick. The Daleks' début in the programme's second serial, The Daleks (1963–1964), made both the Daleks and Doctor Who very popular. A Dalek appeared on a postage stamp celebrating British popular culture in 1999, photographed by Lord Snowdon. In "Victory of the Daleks" a new set of Daleks were introduced that come in a range of colours; the colour denoting its role within the species.

Cybermen

Cybermen were originally a wholly organic species of humanoids originating on Earth's twin planet Mondas that began to implant more and more artificial parts into their bodies. This led to the race becoming coldly logical and calculating cyborgs, with emotions usually only shown when naked aggression was called for. With the demise of Mondas, they acquired Telos as their new home planet. They continue to be a recurring 'monster' within the Doctor Who franchise.

The 2006 series introduced a new variation of Cybermen. These Cybus Cybermen were created in a parallel universe by the mad inventor John Lumic; he was attempting to preserve the humans by transplanting their brains into powerful metal bodies, sending them orders using a mobile phone network and inhibiting their emotions with an electronic chip.

The Master

The Master is the Doctor's archenemy, a renegade Time Lord who desires to rule the universe. Conceived as "Professor Moriarty to the Doctor's Sherlock Holmes", the character first appeared in 1971. As with the Doctor, the role has been portrayed by several actors, since the Master is a Time Lord as well and able to regenerate; the first of these actors was Roger Delgado, who continued in the role until his death in 1973. The Master was briefly played by Peter Pratt and Geoffrey Beevers until Anthony Ainley took over and continued to play the character until Doctor Who's hiatus in 1989. The Master returned in the 1996 television movie of Doctor Who, and was played by American actor Eric Roberts.

Following the series revival in 2005, Derek Jacobi provided the character's reintroduction in the 2007 episode "Utopia". During that story, the role was then assumed by John Simm, who returned to the role multiple times throughout the Tenth Doctor's tenure. As of the 2014 episode "Dark Water", it was revealed that the Master had become a female incarnation or "Time Lady", going by the name of "Missy" (short for Mistress, the feminine equivalent of "Master"). This incarnation is played by Michelle Gomez. Simm returned to his role as the Master alongside Gomez in the tenth series. The Master returned for the 2020 twelfth series with Sacha Dhawan in the role. The character had dubbed himself the "Spy Master" referencing a role he had taken with MI6.

Music

Theme music

The Doctor Who theme music was one of the first electronic music signature tunes for television, and after more than a half century remains one of the most easily recognised. The original theme was composed by Ron Grainer and realised by Delia Derbyshire of the BBC Radiophonic Workshop, with assistance from Dick Mills, and was released as a single on Decca F 11837 in 1964. The Derbyshire arrangement served, with minor edits, as the theme tune-up to the end of season 17 (1979–1980). It is regarded as a significant and innovative piece of electronic music recorded well before the availability of commercial synthesisers or multitrack mixers. Each note was individually created by cutting, splicing, speeding up and slowing down segments of analogue tape containing recordings of a single plucked string, white noise, and the simple harmonic waveforms of test-tone oscillators, intended for calibrating equipment and rooms, not creating music. New techniques were invented to allow mixing of the music, as this was before the era of multitrack tape machines. On hearing the finished result, Grainer asked, "Jeez, Delia, did I write that?" She answered, "Most of it." Although Grainer was willing to give Derbyshire the co-composer credit, it was against BBC policy at the time. Derbyshire would not receive an on-screen credit until the 50th-anniversary story "The Day of the Doctor" in 2013.

A different arrangement was recorded by Peter Howell for season 18 (1980), which was in turn replaced by Dominic Glynn's arrangement for the season-long serial The Trial of a Time Lord in season 23 (1986). Keff McCulloch provided the new arrangement for the Seventh Doctor's era, which lasted from season 24 (1987) until the series' suspension in 1989. American composer John Debney created a new arrangement of Ron Grainer's original theme for Doctor Who in 1996. For the return of the series in 2005, Murray Gold provided a new arrangement, which featured samples from the 1963 original with further elements added, in the 2005 Christmas episode "The Christmas Invasion".

A new arrangement of the theme, once again by Gold, was introduced in the 2007 Christmas special episode, "Voyage of the Damned"; Gold returned as composer for the 2010 series. He was responsible for a new version of the theme which was reported to have had a hostile reception from some viewers. In 2011, the theme tune charted at number 228 of radio station Classic FM's Hall of Fame, a survey of classical music tastes. A revised version of Gold's 2010 arrangement had its debut over the opening titles of the 2012 Christmas special "The Snowmen", and a further revision of the arrangement was made for the 50th-anniversary special "The Day of the Doctor" in November 2013.

Versions of the "Doctor Who Theme" have also been released as pop music. In the early 1970s, Jon Pertwee, who had played the Third Doctor, recorded a version of the Doctor Who theme with spoken lyrics, titled, "Who Is the Doctor". In 1978, a disco version of the theme in the UK, Denmark and Australia by the group Mankind, which reached number 24 in the UK charts. In 1988, the band The Justified Ancients of Mu Mu (later known as The KLF) released the single "Doctorin' the Tardis" under the name The Timelords, which reached No. 1 in the UK and No. 2 in Australia; this version incorporated several other songs, including "Rock and Roll Part 2" by Gary Glitter (who recorded vocals for some of the CD-single remix versions of "Doctorin' the Tardis"). Others who have covered or reinterpreted the theme include Orbital, Pink Floyd, the Australian string ensemble Fourplay, New Zealand punk band Blam Blam Blam, The Pogues, Thin Lizzy, Dub Syndicate, and the comedians Bill Bailey and Mitch Benn. Both the theme and obsessive fans were satirised on The Chaser's War on Everything. The theme tune has also appeared on many compilation CDs, and has made its way into mobile-phone ringtones. Fans have also produced and distributed their own remixes of the theme. In January 2011, the Mankind version was released as a digital download on the album Gallifrey And Beyond.

On 26 June 2018, producer Chris Chibnall announced that the musical score for series 11 would be provided by Royal Birmingham Conservatoire alumnus Segun Akinola.

Incidental music

Most of the innovative incidental music for Doctor Who has been specially commissioned from freelance composers, although in the early years some episodes also used stock music, as well as occasional excerpts from original recordings or cover versions of songs by popular music acts such as The Beatles and The Beach Boys. Since its 2005 return, the series has featured occasional use of excerpts of pop music from the 1970s to the 2000s.

The incidental music for the first Doctor Who adventure, An Unearthly Child, was written by Norman Kay. Many of the stories of the William Hartnell period were scored by electronic music pioneer Tristram Cary, whose Doctor Who credits include The Daleks, Marco Polo, The Daleks' Master Plan, The Gunfighters and The Mutants. Other composers in this early period included Richard Rodney Bennett, Carey Blyton and Geoffrey Burgon.

The most frequent musical contributor during the first 15 years was Dudley Simpson, who is also well known for his theme and incidental music for Blake's 7, and for his haunting theme music and score for the original 1970s version of The Tomorrow People. Simpson's first Doctor Who score was Planet of Giants (1964) and he went on to write music for many adventures of the 1960s and 1970s, including most of the stories of the Jon Pertwee/Tom Baker periods, ending with The Horns of Nimon (1979). He also made a cameo appearance in The Talons of Weng-Chiang (as a Music hall conductor).

In 1980 starting with the serial The Leisure Hive the task of creating incidental music was assigned to the Radiophonic Workshop. Paddy Kingsland and Peter Howell contributed many scores in this period and other contributors included Roger Limb, Malcolm Clarke and Jonathan Gibbs.

The Radiophonic Workshop was dropped after 1986's The Trial of a Time Lord series, and Keff McCulloch took over as the series' main composer until the end of its run, with Dominic Glynn and Mark Ayres also contributing scores.

From the 2005 revival to the 2017 Christmas episode "Twice Upon a Time", all incidental music for the series was composed by Murray Gold and Ben Foster and has been performed by the BBC National Orchestra of Wales from the 2005 Christmas episode "The Christmas Invasion" onwards. A concert featuring the orchestra performing music from the first two series took place on 19 November 2006 to raise money for Children in Need. David Tennant hosted the event, introducing the different sections of the concert. Murray Gold and Russell T Davies answered questions during the interval, and Daleks and Cybermen appeared whilst music from their stories was played. The concert aired on BBCi on Christmas Day 2006. A Doctor Who Prom was celebrated on 27 July 2008 in the Royal Albert Hall as part of the annual BBC Proms. The BBC Philharmonic and the London Philharmonic Choir performed Murray Gold's compositions for the series, conducted by Ben Foster, as well as a selection of classics based on the theme of space and time. The event was presented by Freema Agyeman and guest-presented by various other stars of the show with numerous monsters participating in the proceedings. It also featured the specially filmed mini-episode "Music of the Spheres", written by Russell T Davies and starring David Tennant.

Six soundtracks have been released since 2005. The first featured tracks from the first two series, the second and third featured music from the third and fourth series respectively. The fourth was released on 4 October 2010 as a two-disc special edition and contained music from the 2008–2010 specials (The Next Doctor to "End of Time Part 2"). The soundtrack for Series 5 was released on 8 November 2010. In February 2011, a soundtrack was released for the 2010 Christmas special "A Christmas Carol", and in December 2011, the soundtrack for Series 6 was released, both by Silva Screen Records.

In 2013, a 50th-anniversary boxed set of audio CDs was released featuring music and sound effects from Doctor Who's 50-year history. The celebration continued in 2016 with the release of Doctor Who: The 50th Anniversary Collection Four LP Box Set by New York City-based Spacelab9. The company pressed 1,000 copies of the set on "Metallic Silver" vinyl, dubbed the "Cyberman Edition".

Viewership

United Kingdom

Premiering the day after the assassination of John F. Kennedy, the first episode of Doctor Who was repeated with the second episode the following week. Doctor Who has always appeared initially on the BBC's mainstream BBC One channel, where it is regarded as a family show, drawing audiences of many millions of viewers; episodes were also repeated on BBC Three, before it transitioned to an online-only channel. The programme's popularity has waxed and waned over the decades, with three notable periods of high ratings. The first of these was the "Dalekmania" period, when the popularity of the Daleks regularly brought Doctor Who ratings of between 9 and 14 million, even for stories which did not feature them. The second was the mid to late 1970s, when Tom Baker occasionally drew audiences of over 12 million.

During the ITV network strike of 1979, viewership peaked at 16 million. Figures remained respectable into the 1980s, but fell noticeably after the programme's 23rd series was postponed in 1985 and the show was off the air for 18 months.

Its late 1980s performance of three to five million viewers was seen as poor at the time and was, according to the BBC Board of Control, a leading cause of the programme's 1989 suspension. Some fans considered this disingenuous, since the programme was scheduled against the soap opera Coronation Street, the most popular show at the time. During Tennant's run (the third notable period of high ratings), the show had consistently high viewership, with the Christmas specials regularly attracting over 10 million.

The BBC One broadcast of "Rose", the first episode of the 2005 revival, drew an average audience of 10.81 million, third highest for BBC One that week and seventh across all channels. The current revival also garners the highest audience Appreciation Index of any drama on television.

International

Doctor Who has been broadcast internationally outside of the United Kingdom since 1964, a year after the show first aired. , the modern series has been broadcast in more than 50 countries. The 50th anniversary was broadcast In 94 countries and screened to more than half a million people in cinemas across Australia, Latin America, North America and Europe. The scope of the broadcast was a world record, according to Guinness World Records.

Doctor Who is one of the five top-grossing titles for BBC Worldwide, the BBC's commercial arm. BBC Worldwide CEO John Smith has said that Doctor Who is one of a small number of "Superbrands" which Worldwide will promote heavily.

Only four episodes have premiere showings on channels other than BBC One. The 1983 20th-anniversary special The Five Doctors had its début on 23 November (the actual date of the anniversary) on a number of PBS stations two days before its BBC One broadcast. The 1988 story Silver Nemesis was broadcast with all three episodes airing back to back on TVNZ in New Zealand in November, after the first episode had been shown in the UK but before the final two instalments had aired there.

Starting with the 60th-anniversary specials in 2023, Doctor Who will be released on Disney+ outside of the United Kingdom and Ireland.

Oceania

New Zealand was the first country outside the United Kingdom to screen Doctor Who, beginning in September 1964, and continued to screen the series for many years, including the new revived series that aired on Prime Television from 2005 to 2017. In 2018, the series is aired on Fridays on TVNZ 2, and on TVNZ On Demand on the same episode as the UK. The series moved to TVNZ 1 in 2021.

In Australia, the show has had a strong fan base since its inception, having been exclusively first run by the Australian Broadcasting Corporation (ABC) since January 1965. The ABC has periodically repeated episodes; of note were the daily screenings of all available classic episodes starting in 2003 for the show's 40th anniversary and the weekly screenings of all available revived episodes in 2013 for the show's 50th anniversary. The ABC broadcast the modern series' first run on ABC1 and ABC Me, with repeats on ABC2 and streaming available on ABC iview.

Americas

The series also has a fan base in the United States, where it was shown in syndication from the 1970s to the 1990s, particularly on PBS stations.

TVOntario picked up the show in 1976 beginning with The Three Doctors and aired each series (several years late) through to series 24 in 1991. From 1979 to 1981, TVO airings were bookended by science-fiction writer Judith Merril who introduced the episode and then, after the episode concluded, tried to place it in an educational context in keeping with TVO's status as an educational channel. Its airing of The Talons of Weng-Chiang was cancelled as a result of accusations that the story was racist; the story was later broadcast in the 1990s on cable station YTV. CBC began showing the series again in 2005. The series moved to the Canadian cable channel Space in 2009.

Series three began broadcasting on CBC on 18 June 2007 followed by the second Christmas special, "The Runaway Bride", at midnight, and the Sci Fi Channel began on 6 July 2007, starting with the second Christmas special at 8:00 pm E/P followed by the first episode.

Series four aired in the United States on the Sci Fi Channel (now known as Syfy), beginning in April 2008. It aired on CBC beginning 19 September 2008, although the CBC did not air the "Voyage of the Damned" special. The Canadian cable network Space (now known as CTV Sci-Fi Channel) broadcast "The Next Doctor" (in March 2009) and all subsequent series and specials.

Asia
Series 1 through 3 of Doctor Who were broadcast on various NHK channels from 2006 to 2008 with Japanese subtitles. Beginning on 2 August 2009, upon the launch of Disney XD in Japan, the series has been broadcast with Japanese dubbing.

Home media

A wide selection of serials is available from BBC Video on DVD, on sale in the United Kingdom, Australia, Canada and the United States. Every fully extant serial has been released on VHS, and BBC Worldwide continues to regularly release serials on DVD. The 2005 series is also available in its entirety on UMD for the PlayStation Portable. Eight original series serials have been released on Laserdisc and many have also been released on Betamax tape and Video 2000. One episode of Doctor Who (The Infinite Quest) was released on VCD. Only the series from 2005 onwards are also available on Blu-ray, except for the 1970 story Spearhead from Space, released in July 2013, and the 1996 TV film Doctor Who, released in September 2016.

Over 600 episodes of the classic series (the first 8 Doctors, from 1963 to 1996) are available to stream on BritBox (launched in 2017) and Pluto TV. From 2020, the revival series is available for streaming on HBO Max, as well as spin-offs Sarah Jane Adventures and Torchwood.

Adaptations and other appearances

Dr. Who films

There are two Dr. Who  feature films: Dr. Who and the Daleks, released in 1965 and Daleks' Invasion Earth 2150 A.D. in 1966. Both are retellings of existing television stories (specifically, the first two Dalek serials, The Daleks and The Dalek Invasion of Earth respectively) with a larger budget and alterations to the series concept.

In these films, Peter Cushing plays a human scientist named "Dr. Who" who travels with his granddaughter, niece, and other companions in a time machine he has invented. The Cushing version of the character reappears in both comic strips and a short story, the latter attempting to reconcile the film continuity with that of the series.

In addition, several planned films were proposed, including a sequel, The Chase, loosely based on the original series story, for the Cushing Doctor, plus many attempted television movie and big-screen productions to revive the original Doctor Who after the original series was cancelled.

Paul McGann starred in the only television film as the eighth incarnation of the Doctor. After the film, he continued the role in audio dramas and was confirmed as the eighth incarnation through flashback footage and a mini episode in the 2005 revival, effectively linking the two series and the television movie.

In 2011, David Yates announced that he had started work with the BBC on a Doctor Who film, a project that would take three or more years to complete. Yates indicated that the film would take a different approach from Doctor Who, although then  Doctor Who showrunner Steven Moffat stated later that any such film would not be a reboot of the series and that a film should be made by the BBC team and star the current TV Doctor.

Spin-offs

Doctor Who has appeared on stage numerous times. In the early 1970s, Trevor Martin played the role in Doctor Who and the Daleks in the Seven Keys to Doomsday. In the late 1980s, Jon Pertwee and Colin Baker both played the Doctor at different times during the run of a play titled Doctor Who – The Ultimate Adventure. For two performances, while Pertwee was ill, David Banks (better known for playing Cybermen) played the Doctor. Other original plays have been staged as amateur productions, with other actors playing the Doctor, while Terry Nation wrote The Curse of the Daleks, a stage play mounted in the late 1960s, but without the Doctor.

A pilot episode ("A Girl's Best Friend") for a potential spin-off series, K-9 and Company, aired in 1981, with Elisabeth Sladen reprising her role as companion Sarah Jane Smith and John Leeson as the voice of K9, but was not picked up as a regular series. Concept art for an animated Doctor Who series was produced by animation company Nelvana in the 1980s, but the series was not produced.

Following the success of the 2005 series produced by Russell T Davies, the BBC commissioned Davies to produce a 13-part spin-off series titled Torchwood (an anagram of "Doctor Who"), set in modern-day Cardiff and investigating alien activities and crime. The series debuted on BBC Three on 22 October 2006. John Barrowman reprised his role of Jack Harkness from the 2005 series of Doctor Who. Two other actresses who appeared in Doctor Who also star in the series: Eve Myles as Gwen Cooper, who played the similarly named servant girl Gwyneth in the 2005 Doctor Who episode "The Unquiet Dead", and Naoko Mori, who reprised her role as Toshiko Sato, first seen in "Aliens of London". A second series of Torchwood aired in 2008; for three episodes, the cast was joined by Freema Agyeman reprising her Doctor Who role of Martha Jones. A third series was broadcast from 6 to 10 July 2009, and consisted of a single five-part story called Children of Earth which was set largely in London. A fourth series, Torchwood: Miracle Day jointly produced by BBC Wales, BBC Worldwide and the American entertainment company Starz debuted in 2011. The series was predominantly set in the United States, though Wales remained part of the show's setting.

The Sarah Jane Adventures, starring Elisabeth Sladen who reprised her role as investigative journalist Sarah Jane Smith, was developed by CBBC; a special aired on New Year's Day 2007, and a full series began on 24 September 2007. A second series followed in 2008, notable for (as noted above) featuring the return of Brigadier Lethbridge-Stewart. A third in 2009 featured a crossover appearance from the main show by David Tennant as the Tenth Doctor. In 2010, a further such appearance featured Matt Smith as the Eleventh Doctor alongside former companion actress Katy Manning reprising her role as Jo Grant. A final, three-story fifth series was transmitted in autumn 2011 – uncompleted due to the death of Elisabeth Sladen in early 2011.

An animated serial, The Infinite Quest, aired alongside the 2007 series of Doctor Who as part of the children's television series Totally Doctor Who. The serial featured the voices of series regulars David Tennant and Freema Agyeman but is not considered part of the 2007 series. A second animated serial, Dreamland, aired in six parts on the BBC Red Button service, and the official Doctor Who website in 2009.

Class, featuring students of Coal Hill School, was first aired on-line on BBC Three from 22 October 2016, as a series of eight 45 minute episodes, written by Patrick Ness. Peter Capaldi as the Twelfth Doctor appears in the show's first episode. The series was picked up by BBC America on 8 January 2016 and by BBC One a day later. On 7 September 2017, BBC Three controller Damian Kavanagh confirmed that the series had officially been cancelled.

Numerous other spin-off series have been created not by the BBC but by the respective owners of the characters and concepts. Such spin-offs include the novel and audio drama series Faction Paradox, Iris Wildthyme and Bernice Summerfield; as well as the made-for-video series P.R.O.B.E.; the Australian-produced television series K-9, which aired a 26-episode first season on Disney XD; and the audio spin-off Counter-Measures.

Aftershows
When the revived series of Doctor Who was brought back, an aftershow series was created by the BBC, titled Doctor Who Confidential. There have been three aftershow series created, with the latest one titled Doctor Who: The Fan Show, which began airing from the tenth series. Each series follows behind-the-scenes footage on the making of Doctor Who through clips and interviews with the cast, production crew and other people, including those who have participated in the television series in some manner. Each episode deals with a different topic, and in most cases refers to the Doctor Who episode that preceded it.

Charity episodes
In 1983, coinciding with the series' 20th anniversary, The Five Doctors was shown as part of the annual BBC Children in Need Appeal, however it was not a charity-based production, simply scheduled within the line-up of Friday 25 November 1983. This was the programme's first co-production with Australian broadcaster ABC. At 90 minutes long it was the longest single episode of Doctor Who produced to date. It featured three of the first five Doctors, a new actor to replace the deceased William Hartnell, and unused footage to represent Tom Baker.

In 1993, for the franchise's 30th anniversary, another charity special, Dimensions in Time, was produced for Children in Need, featuring all the surviving actors who played the Doctor and a number of previous companions. It also featured a crossover with the soap opera EastEnders, the action taking place in the latter's Albert Square location and around Greenwich. The special was one of several special 3D programmes the BBC produced at the time, using a 3D system that made use of the Pulfrich effect, requiring glasses with one darkened lens; the picture would look normal to those viewers who watched without the glasses.

In 1999, another special, Doctor Who and the Curse of Fatal Death, was made for Comic Relief and later released on VHS. An affectionate parody of the television series, it was split into four segments, mimicking the traditional serial format, complete with cliffhangers, and running down the same corridor several times when being chased (the version released on video was split into only two episodes). In the story, the Doctor (Rowan Atkinson) encounters both the Master (Jonathan Pryce) and the Daleks. During the special, the Doctor is forced to regenerate several times, with his subsequent incarnations played by, in order, Richard E. Grant, Jim Broadbent, Hugh Grant, and Joanna Lumley. The script was written by Steven Moffat, later to be head writer and executive producer of the revived series.

Since the return of Doctor Who in 2005, the franchise has produced two original "mini-episodes" to support Children in Need. The first, which aired in November 2005, was an untitled seven-minute scene introducing David Tennant as the Tenth Doctor. It was followed in November 2007 by "Time Crash", a 7-minute scene that featured the Tenth Doctor meeting the Fifth Doctor, Peter Davison.

A set of two mini-episodes, titled "Space" and "Time" respectively, were produced to support Comic Relief. They were aired during the Comic Relief 2011 event. During Children in Need 2011, an exclusively filmed segment showed the Doctor addressing the viewer, attempting to persuade them to purchase items of his clothing, which were going up for auction for Children in Need. Children in Need 2012 featured the mini-episode "The Great Detective".

Spoofs and cultural references

Doctor Who has been satirised and spoofed on many occasions by comedians including Spike Milligan (a Dalek invades his bathroom—Milligan, naked, hurls a soap sponge at it) and Lenny Henry. Jon Culshaw frequently impersonates the Fourth Doctor in the BBC Dead Ringers series. Doctor Who fandom has also been lampooned on programs such as Saturday Night Live, The Chaser's War on Everything, Mystery Science Theater 3000, Family Guy, American Dad!, Futurama, South Park,
Community as Inspector Spacetime, The Simpsons and The Big Bang Theory. As part of the 50th-anniversary programmes, former Fifth Doctor Peter Davison directed, wrote, and co-starred in the parody The Five(ish) Doctors Reboot, which also starred two other former Doctors, Colin Baker and Sylvester McCoy, and had cameo appearances from cast and crew involved in the programme, including showrunner Steven Moffat and Doctors Paul McGann, David Tennant, and Matt Smith.

The Doctor in his fourth incarnation has been represented on several episodes of The Simpsons and Matt Groening's other animated series Futurama. A fan of Doctor Who since childhood, Groening favours Tom Baker's fourth Doctor, with Simpsons writer Ron Hauge stating, "There are several Doctor Who actors but Tom Baker is the one we always go with."

There have also been many references to Doctor Who in popular culture and other science fiction, including Star Trek: The Next Generation ("The Neutral Zone") and Leverage. In the Channel 4 series Queer as Folk (created by later Doctor Who executive producer Russell T. Davies), the character of Vince was portrayed as an avid Doctor Who fan, with references appearing many times throughout in the form of clips from the programme. In a similar manner, the character of Oliver on Coupling (created and written by Steven Moffat) is portrayed as a Doctor Who collector and enthusiast.
References to Doctor Who have also appeared in the young adult fantasy novels Brisingr and High Wizardry, the video game Rock Band, the Adult Swim comedy show Robot Chicken, the Family Guy episodes "Blue Harvest" and "420", and the game RuneScape. It has also been referenced in Destroy All Humans! 2, by civilians in the game's variation of England, and multiple times throughout the Ace Attorney series.

Doctor Who has been a reference in several political cartoons, from a 1964 cartoon in the Daily Mail depicting Charles de Gaulle as a Dalek to a 2008 edition of This Modern World by Tom Tomorrow in which the Tenth Doctor informs an incredulous character from 2003 that the Democratic Party will nominate an African-American as its presidential candidate.

The word "TARDIS" is an entry in the Shorter Oxford English Dictionary, and the iOS dictionary.

Museums and exhibitions

There have been various exhibitions of Doctor Who in the United Kingdom, including the now closed exhibitions at:
 Land's End (Cornwall)
 Blackpool
 Llangollen
 Kelvingrove Museum, Glasgow
 Coventry Transport Museum, Coventry
 Centre for Life, Newcastle upon Tyne
 Melbourne, Australia
 Kensington Olympia Two, London
 Longleat, which ran for 30 years.
 Cardiff (the city where the series is filmed).
The Cardiff exhibition closed on 9 September 2017.

Merchandise

Since its beginnings, Doctor Who has generated hundreds of products related to the show, from toys and games to collectible picture cards and postage stamps. These include board games, card games, gamebooks, computer games, roleplaying games, action figures and a pinball game. Many games have been released that feature the Daleks, including Dalek computer games.

Audio

The earliest Doctor Who–related audio release was a 21-minute narrated abridgement of the First Doctor television story The Chase released in 1966.  Ten years later, the first original Doctor Who audio was released on LP record; Doctor Who and the Pescatons featuring the Fourth Doctor. The first commercially available audiobook was an abridged reading of the Fourth Doctor story State of Decay in 1981. In 1988, during a hiatus in the television show, Slipback, the first radio drama, was transmitted.

Since 1999, Big Finish Productions has released several different series of Doctor Who audios on CD.  The earliest of these featured the Fifth, Sixth and Seventh Doctors, with Paul McGann's Eight Doctor joining the line in 2001.  Tom Baker's Fourth Doctor began appearing for Big Finish in 2012.  Along with the main range, adventures of the First, Second and Third Doctors have been produced in both limited cast and full cast formats, as well as audiobooks. The 2013 series Destiny of the Doctor, produced as part of the series' 50th-anniversary celebrations, marked the first time Big Finish created stories (in this case audiobooks) featuring the Doctors from the revived show. Along with this, in May 2016, the Tenth Doctor, David Tennant, appeared alongside Catherine Tate in a collection of three audio adventures. In August 2020, Big Finish announced a new series of audios beginning release in May 2021, featuring Christopher Eccleston reprising his role as the Ninth Doctor.

In addition to these main lines, both the BBC and Big Finish have produced original audio dramas and audiobooks based on spin-off material, such as Torchwood and The Sarah Jane Adventures series.

The main range, Doctor Who: The Monthly Adventures, holds the Guinness World Record for the longest-running science fiction audio play series.

In 2022, BBC Sounds began airing Doctor Who: Redacted, a 10-episode podcast written by Juno Dawson and starring Charlie Craggs and Jodie Whittaker. The podcast focuses on a trio of friends who host a paranormal conspiracy podcast, "The Blue Box Files", and end up getting involved in much more than they expected.

Books

Doctor Who books have been published from the mid-sixties through to the present day. From 1965 to 1991 the books published were primarily novelised adaptations of broadcast episodes; beginning in 1991 an extensive line of original fiction was launched, the Virgin New Adventures and Virgin Missing Adventures. Since the relaunch of the programme in 2005, a new range of novels has been published by BBC Books. Numerous non-fiction books about the series, including guidebooks and critical studies, have also been published, and a dedicated Doctor Who Magazine with newsstand circulation has been published regularly since 1979. This is published by Panini, as is the Doctor Who Adventures magazine for younger fans.

See also:
 List of Doctor Who novelisations
 List of Doctor Who anthologies (2009–present)
 Eighth Doctor Adventures
 Past Doctor Adventures
 New Series Adventures

Video games

Numerous Doctor Who video games have been created from the mid-80s through to the present day. A Doctor Who game was planned for the Sega Mega Drive but never released. One of the recent ones is a match-3 game released in November 2013 for iOS, Android, Amazon App Store and Facebook called Doctor Who: Legacy. It has been constantly updated since its release and features all the Doctors as playable characters as well as over 100 companions.

Another video game instalment is LEGO Dimensions – in which Doctor Who is one of the many "Level Packs" in the game. The pack contains the Twelfth Doctor (who can reincarnate into the others), K9, the TARDIS and a Victorian London adventure level area. The game and pack released in November 2015.

Doctor Who: Battle of Time was a digital collectible card game developed by Bandai Namco Entertainment and released for iOS and Android. It was soft-launched on 30 May 2018 in Australia, Canada, New Zealand, Thailand, but was shutdown on 26 November of that same year.

Doctor Who Infinity was released on Steam on 7 August 2018. It was nominated for "Best Start-up" at The Independent Game Developers' Association Awards 2018.

Chronology and canonicity
Since the creation of the Doctor Who character by BBC Television in the early 1960s, a myriad of stories have been published about Doctor Who, in different media: apart from the actual television episodes that continue to be produced by the BBC, there have also been novels, comics, short stories, audio books, radio plays, interactive video games, game books, webcasts, DVD extras, and stage performances. The BBC takes no position on the canonicity of any of such stories, and producers of the show have expressed distaste for the idea of canonicity.

Awards

The show has received recognition as one of Britain's finest television programmes, winning the 2006 British Academy Television Award for Best Drama Series and five consecutive (2005–2010) awards at the National Television Awards during Russell T Davies' tenure as executive producer. In 2011, Matt Smith became the first Doctor to be nominated for a BAFTA Television Award for Best Actor, and in 2016, Michelle Gomez became the first female to receive a BAFTA nomination for the series, getting a Best Supporting Actress nomination for her work as Missy.

In 2013, the Peabody Awards honoured Doctor Who with an Institutional Peabody "for evolving with technology and the times like nothing else in the known television universe." The programme is listed in Guinness World Records as the longest-running science-fiction television show in the world, as the "most successful" science-fiction series of all time—based on its overall broadcast ratings, DVD and book sales, and iTunes traffic— and for the largest ever simulcast of a TV drama with its 50th-anniversary special. During its original run, it was recognised for its imaginative stories, creative low-budget special effects, and pioneering use of electronic music (originally produced by the BBC Radiophonic Workshop).

In 1975, Season 11 of the series won a Writers' Guild of Great Britain award for Best Writing in a Children's Serial. In 1996, BBC television held the "Auntie Awards" as the culmination of their "TV60" series, celebrating 60 years of BBC television broadcasting, where Doctor Who was voted as the "Best Popular Drama" the corporation had ever produced, ahead of such ratings heavyweights as EastEnders and Casualty. In 2000, Doctor Who was ranked third in a list of the 100 Greatest British Television Programmes of the 20th century, produced by the British Film Institute and voted on by industry professionals. In 2005, the series came first in a survey by SFX magazine of "The Greatest UK Science Fiction and Fantasy Television Series Ever". In Channel 4‘s 2001 list of the 100 Greatest Kids' TV shows, Doctor Who was placed at number nine. In 2004 and 2007, Doctor Who was ranked number 18 and number 22 on TV Guide's Top Cult Shows Ever. In 2013, TV Guide ranked it as the number 6 sci-fi show.

The revived series has received recognition from critics and the public, across various awards ceremonies. It won five BAFTA TV Awards, including Best Drama Series, the highest-profile and most prestigious British television award for which the series has ever been nominated. It was very popular at the BAFTA Cymru Awards, with 25 wins overall including Best Drama Series (twice), Best Screenplay/Screenwriter (thrice) and Best Actor. It was also nominated for 7 Saturn Awards, winning the only Best International Series in the ceremony's history. In 2009, Doctor Who was voted the 3rd greatest show of the 2000s by Channel 4, behind Top Gear and The Apprentice. The episode "Vincent and the Doctor" was shortlisted for a Mind Award at the 2010 Mind Mental Health Media Awards for its "touching" portrayal of Vincent van Gogh.

It has won the Short Form of the Hugo Award for Best Dramatic Presentation, the oldest science fiction/fantasy award for films and series, six times since 2006. The winning episodes were "The Empty Child"/"The Doctor Dances" (2006), "The Girl in the Fireplace" (2007), "Blink" (2008), "The Waters of Mars" (2010), "The Pandorica Opens"/"The Big Bang" (2011), and "The Doctor's Wife" (2012). The 2016 Christmas special "The Return of Doctor Mysterio" was  also a finalist for the 2017 Hugo Awards. Doctor Who star Matt Smith won Best Actor in the 2012 National Television awards alongside Karen Gillan, who won Best Actress. Doctor Who has been nominated for over 200 awards and has won over a hundred of them.

As a British series, the majority of its nominations and awards have been for national competitions such as the BAFTAs, but it has occasionally received nominations in mainstream American awards, most notably a nomination for "Favorite Sci-Fi Show" in the 2008 People's Choice Awards, and the series has been nominated multiple times in the Spike Scream Awards, with Smith winning Best Science Fiction Actor in 2011. The Canadian Constellation Awards have also recognised the series.

See also

 Doctor Who in popular culture
 List of Doctor Who Christmas specials
 List of Doctor Who universe creatures and aliens
 Time travel in fiction

Explanatory notes

References

Citations

Cited texts

Further reading
 Matt Hills. Triumph of a Time Lord: Regenerating "Doctor Who" in the Twenty-First Century (I. B. Tauris, 2010). 261 pages. Discusses the revival of the BBC's Doctor Who in 2005 after it had been off the air as a regular series for more than 15 years; topics include the role of "fandom" in the sci-fi programme's return, and notions of "cult" and "mainstream" in television.

Scholarly views
 
 
 Charles, Alec. "War Without End?: Utopia, the Family, and the Post-9/11 World in Russell T. Davies's Doctor Who. Science Fiction Studies (2008): 450–465.
 Charles, Alec. 2011. "The crack of doom: The uncanny echoes of Steven Moffat's Doctor Who". Science Fiction Film and Television; Vol. 4, Issue 1, Spring 2011. Liverpool University Press. This analysis is framed specifically by the Freudian notion of the uncanny, and suggests that Moffat's work on Doctor Who confronts unconscious perceptions, repressed fears and death itself through storytelling techniques which attempt to connect directly with the audience by deconstructing the distance between material reality and the series's fantasy space.
 Fisher, R. Michael, and Barbara Bickel. "The Mystery of Dr. Who? On A Road Less Traveled in Art Education". Journal of Social Theory in Art Education 26.1 (2006): 28–57.
 Fiske, John. "Popularity and ideology: A structuralist reading of Dr. Who". Interpreting television: Current research perspectives (1984): 165–198.
 McCormack, Una (2011). "He's Not the Messiah: Undermining Political and Religious Authority in New Doctor Who". In Bradshaw, S., Anthony Keen and Graham Sleight (eds.), The Unsilent Library: Essays on the Russell T. Davies Era of the New Doctor Who. The Science Fiction Foundation.
 Orthia, Lindy A. "Antirationalist critique or fifth column of scientism? Challenges from Doctor Who to the mad scientist trope". Public Understanding of Science 20.4 (2011): 525–542.
 Perryman, Neil. "Doctor Who and the Convergence of Media: A Case Study in Transmedia Storytelling". Convergence 14.1 (2008): 21–39.

External links

Official websites
 
 
 Doctor Who at BBC Worldwide
 Archived websites: 1963–1996, 2005–2007, 2008
 Production website

Reference websites

 Doctor Who Reference Guide – synopses of all media based on the series (1963–2012)
 Doctor Who at IMDb: 1963, 1996, 2005
 
 

 
1960s British drama television series
1960s British science fiction television series
1963 British television series debuts
1970s British drama television series
1970s British science fiction television series
1980s British drama television series
1980s British science fiction television series
1989 British television series endings
2000s British drama television series
2000s British science fiction television series
2005 British television series debuts
2010s British drama television series
2010s British science fiction television series
2020s British drama television series
2020s British science fiction television series
Adventure television series
BAFTA winners (television series)
BBC Cymru Wales television shows
BBC high definition shows
BBC Television shows
Black-and-white British television shows
British science fiction television shows
British television series revived after cancellation
British time travel television series
English-language television shows
Fiction about intergalactic travel
First-run syndicated television programs in the United States
Hugo Award-winning television series
Mass media franchises introduced in 1963
Nonlinear narrative television series
Peabody Award-winning television programs
Saturn Award-winning television series
Soft science fiction
Space adventure television series
Television series about extraterrestrial life
Television series about parallel universes
Television series by BBC Studios
Television series created by C. E. Webber
Television series created by Donald Wilson (writer and producer)
Television series created by Sydney Newman
Television series produced at Pinewood Studios
Television series set in the future
Television series set on fictional planets
Television shows adapted into comics
Television shows adapted into films
Television shows adapted into novels
Television shows adapted into video games
Temporal war fiction
Television shows filmed in Wales